Plivot is a commune in the Marne department in northeastern France.

From 1 December 1939 until 15 February 1940 No. 139 Squadron RAF was deployed to a local airfield nearby with Bristol Blenheim IV's as of the Second World War's RAF Advanced Air Striking Force.

See also
Communes of the Marne department

References

Citations

Bibliography

Communes of Marne (department)